The 1788 English cricket season was the 17th in which matches have been awarded retrospective first-class cricket status and the second after the foundation of the Marylebone Cricket Club. The season saw 11 first-class matches played in the country.

In May, MCC published a revised code of the Laws of Cricket, calling themselves the "Cricket Club at Marylebone". This established the club as being in charge of the Laws and responsible for the sport's governance.

Laws of Cricket

MCC produced the first official Laws of Cricket in a meeting on 30 May. The Laws provided a more detailed version of the previous codes under which the game had been played, including specifying the size of the pitch, ball and wickets. It introduced a version of the Leg Before Wicket Law which specified that the ball was required to pitch between the stumps in order for a batsman to be out. The 1788 version of the Laws also included a section on dealing with the issue of gambling in the game, as many 18th century matches attracted large gambling stakes, and it was common for players to bet on matches they were taking part in.

Matches 
A total of 11 top-class matches were played during the season, most of them featuring sides from Hampshire, Kent or Surrey. Two matches were also played between teams named A to M and N to Z, one at Lord's Old Ground and the other at Bishopsbourne in Kent.

A non-top-class match between MCC and White Conduit Club, from which it was largely derived, is the earliest featuring MCC for which a scorecard survives.

First mentions
A number of players are first noted in first-class matches in 1788, amongst them the Hampshire professional Andrew Freemantle who played the first of his 134 first-class matches in a career which lasted until 1810.

References

Further reading
 
 
 
 
 

1788 in English cricket
English cricket seasons in the 18th century